Tyler Perry's Young Dylan is an American comedy television series created by Tyler Perry that premiered on Nickelodeon on February 29, 2020. The series stars Dylan Gilmer, Celina Smith, Hero Hunter, Jet Miller, Mieko Hillman, Aloma Lesley Wright, and Carl Anthony Payne, II.

In November 2021, the series was renewed for a third season, which premiered in June 2022.

Premise 
Young Dylan is an aspiring hip-hop artist. When his mother doesn't come home one day, his grandmother Viola moves him in with his uncle Myles and aunt Yasmine to have parental figures in his life. His style clashes with the styles of Myles' family.

Cast

Main 
 Dylan Gilmer as Young Dylan, an aspiring hip-hop artist
 Celina Smith as Rebecca, Young Dylan's older cousin and Charlie's older sister
 Hero Hunter as Charlie, Young Dylan's cousin, who used to have an imaginary friend
 Jet Miller as Bethany, Rebecca's best friend and Young Dylan's love interest
 Mieko Hillman as Yasmine, Young Dylan's aunt, Charlie and Rebecca's mother, and Myles's wife
 Aloma Lesley Wright as Viola, Young Dylan, Charlie and Rebecca's grandmother, Myles's mother, and Yasmine's mother-in-law 
 Carl Anthony Payne, II as Myles Wilson, Young Dylan's uncle, Charlie and Rebecca's father, Yasmine's husband, and Viola's son

Recurring 
 Rodney Hobbs / Rodney J. Hobbs as Principal Matthews
 Samuel Goergen as Booder

Notable guest stars 
 Khaled "DJ Khaled" Khaled as himself
 Chance the Rapper as himself

Production 
On October 2, 2019, it was announced on The Ellen DeGeneres Show that Nickelodeon and Tyler Perry were teaming up to create a comedy series about a 10-year-old rapper with a working title of Young Dylan. Tyler Perry serves as writer for the series, while Tyler Perry Studios produces the series. The series stars Dylan Gilmer as Young Dylan. On January 23, 2020, the cast for the series was announced. In addition to Dylan Gilmer, the cast also includes Carl Anthony Payne II, Mieko Hillman, Celina Smith, Hero Hunter, and Aloma Wright. Tyler Perry also serves as executive producer and director for the series. Michelle Sneed serves as executive producer. Will Areu and Mark E. Swinton serve as producers. Jet Miller was also included in the principal cast as Rebecca's friend Bethany. On February 19, 2020, it was announced that Tyler Perry's Young Dylan, previously Young Dylan, would premiere on February 29, 2020. The series has been given a 14-episode order.

On March 18, 2021, the series was renewed for a second season of 20 episodes, which premiered on June 12, 2021. On November 11, 2021, the series was renewed for a third season of 20 episodes, which premiered on June 19, 2022.

Episodes

Series overview

Season 1 (2020)

Season 2 (2021)

Season 3 (2022–23)

Reception

Ratings 
 

| link2             = #Season 2 (2021)
| episodes2         = 20
| start2            = 
| end2              = 
| startrating2      = 0.30
| endrating2        = 0.28
| viewers2          = |2}} 

| link3             = #Season 3 (2022–23)
| episodes3         = 15
| start3            = 
| end3              = 
| startrating3      = 0.26
| endrating3        = 
| viewers3          = |2}} 
}}

Awards and nominations

References

External links 
 
 

2020s American children's comedy television series
2020s Nickelodeon original programming
2020 American television series debuts
English-language television shows
Television series by Tyler Perry Studios
Television series created by Tyler Perry